Una Noche Más is the second and final studio album by Chris Pérez Band. It was released on April 16, 2002.

Track listing

References

2002 albums
Albums produced by A.B. Quintanilla